Ptychographa is a genus of lichenized fungi in the family Xylographaceae. It is a monotypic genus, containing the single species Ptychographa xylographoides. Both the species and genus were described as new in 1874 by Finnish botanist William Nylander.

References

Baeomycetales
Lichen genera
Baeomycetales genera
Taxa named by William Nylander (botanist)
Taxa described in 1874